Tom Meeusen (born 7 November 1988) is a Belgian cyclo-cross and road racing cyclist, who currently rides for UCI Cyclo-cross team Group Hens–Maes Containers.

Major results

2005–2006
 1st Overall Junior Superprestige
1st Ruddervoorde
1st Sint-Michielsgestel
1st Gavere
1st Diegem
1st Vorselaar
 2nd Overall UCI Junior World Cup
1st Kalmthout
 3rd  UCI World Junior Championships
2007–2008
 1st  National Under-23 Championships
 1st Overall Under-23 Gazet van Antwerpen
1st Koppenberg
 Under-23 Superprestige
1st Ruddervoorde
1st Vorselaar
2008–2009
 Under-23 Gazet van Antwerpen
1st Oostmalle
 1st Under-23 Neerpelt
 1st Under-23 Oostmalle
 1st Under-23 Zonhoven
2009–2010
 1st Overall UCI Under-23 World Cup
1st Heusden-Zolder
1st Roubaix
 1st Overall Under-23 Superprestige
1st Gavere
1st Hamme
1st Gieten
1st Diegem
1st Vorselaar
 1st Overall Under-23 Gazet van Antwerpen
1st Hasselt
1st Essen
1st Loenhout
1st Baal
 1st Under-23 Neerpelt
 2nd  UCI World Under-23 Championships
 3rd  UEC European Under-23 Championships
2010–2011
 UCI World Cup
1st Kalmthout
 Superprestige
1st Gieten
 1st Woerden
2011–2012
 Superprestige
1st Hoogstraten
 Gazet van Antwerpen
1st Lille
2012–2013
 1st Zonnebeke
2013–2014
 UCI World Cup
1st Nommay
 Bpost Bank Trophy
1st Koppenberg
 Superprestige
1st Middelkerke
 1st Eeklo
 1st Rosmalen
 1st Laarne
2014–2015
 Superprestige
1st Ruddervoorde
 1st Overijse
 2nd National Championships
2015–2016
 BPost Bank Trophy
1st Loenhout
 1st Ardooie
 1st Kleicross
 1st Rucphen
2016–2017
 Soudal Classics
1st Sint-Niklaas
 DVV Trophy
2nd Loenhout
3rd Essen
3rd Lille
 3rd Overall UCI World Cup
2nd Hoogerheide
3rd Fiuggi
 3rd Oostmalle
 3rd Mol
2017–2018
 Brico Cross
3rd Hulst
 3rd Overijse
 3rd Mol
2018–2019
 DVV Trophy
2nd Hamme
 Soudal Classics
2nd Leuven
 3rd Sint-Niklaas
 3rd Oostmalle
2019–2020
 2nd Mol
2021–2022
 1st Oisterwijk
 Ethias Cross
2nd Leuven

References

External links 

 

1988 births
Living people
Belgian male cyclists
Cyclo-cross cyclists
People from Brasschaat
Cyclists from Antwerp Province